Peter Browning may refer to:

Peter Browning, character in Inception
Pete Browning (1861–1905), American baseball player